Dhok Baba Faiz Bukhsh  is a village situated in the Samote Union Council, Kallar Syedan and Gujarkhan of district Rawalpindi, Punjab,  Pakistan. Post Code 47490

Coord|

External links
http://wikimapia.org/24242638/Dhok-Faiz-Bukhsh
https://www.facebook.com/dhokebabafaizbakhsh/

Populated places in Kallar Syedan Tehsil